The 1969 Northwestern Wildcats football team represented Northwestern University during the 1969 Big Ten Conference football season.

Junior running back Mike Adamle rushed for 316 yards against Wisconsin on October 18, breaking the previous school record by 98 yards (Charlie Hren vs. Navy in 1951).

Schedule

References

Northwestern
Northwestern Wildcats football seasons
Northwestern Wildcats football